Royal Hollandais was a 90-gun Chatham-class ship of the line

Career 
Started for the Navy of the Batavian Republic as De Ruyter, and renamed Koninklijke Hollander at the foundation of the Kingdom of Holland in 1806, the ship was incorporated in the French Navy as Royal Hollandais when the First French Empire annexed the country. In 1811, that name was shortened to Hollandais. On 10 July, she was appointed to Missiessy's Escaults squadron.

She was returned to the Dutch Navy in 1814, and was decommissioned in 1819.

Notes, citations, and references

Notes

Citations

References
 
 

Ships of the line of the French Navy
1806 ships
Napoleonic-era ships